Ilê Axé Iyá Omin Iyamassê is a Candomblé terreiro in Salvador, Bahia, Brazil. It is also known as the Terreiro do Gantois or the Sociedade São Jorge do Gantois. It is located on Alto do Gantois Avenue in the Federação neighborhood of Salvador. The terreiro is associated with the Ketu branch of the religion. It shares a history with the Ilê Axé Iyá Nassô Oká (Terreiro da Casa Branca) and Ilê Axé Opô Afonjá. The terreiro occupies  ranging from the ridge of a hill and a small valley.

Founding

The terreiro was founded by Mãe Menininha do Gantois (1894-1986). Succession rules limit the head position of the terreiro, the Ialorixá, to female individuals. Senior positions in the terreiro are further restricted to descendants of the founder.

Terreiro

The main structure of the terreiro, known as a barracão, sits at the top of the property and includes a hall for public ceremonies, kitchen is used for the preparation of ritual foods, dining room, dressing rooms, and private rooms for religious leaders of the terreiro. The Mãe Menininha do Gantois Memorial is located adjacent to the main barracão. Shrines dedicated to Exu, Omolu, and Ogun are located outside the main barracão. Of particular importance are a fig tree (Ficus) and a jackfruit tree dedicated to Ogun.

Gantois

The terreiro has historically been known as Gantois, the Portuguese-language name for Ghent, Belgium. The name is a reference to the birthplace of the original owner of the property Edoard Gantois. Gantois was a navigator and slave trader who operated between Bahia and the slave markets of Ouidah, Benin and Lagos, Nigeria. He leased the land to Maria Júlia da Conceição Nazareth, the founder of the terreiro.

Lineage

Maria Júlia da Conceição Nazaré, founder of the terreiro
Pulchéria Maria da Conceição
Maria da Glória Nazareth
Mãe Menininha do Gantois
Mãe Cleusa Millet
Mãe Carmem

Heritage status

Ilê Axé Iyá Omin Iyamassê received heritage status by the Brazilian National Institute of Historic and Artistic Heritage (IPHAN) on December 17, 2002.

References

Candomblé
National heritage sites of Bahia
Religious buildings and structures in Salvador, Bahia
Organisations based in Salvador, Bahia
Candomblé temples